Krehl is a German surname and the name means fragile  – a participle from Czech word křehnout.

Variants

People 

Christoph Krehl (1825–1909), German orientalist
Ludolf von Krehl (1861–1937), German internist and physiologist, son of Christoph Krehl
Constanze Krehl (born 1956), German politician
Stephan Krehl (1864–1924), German composer, teacher, and theoretician

References 

German-language surnames